"Who Taught You to Live Like That?" is the first single released from Sloan's eighth studio album, Never Hear the End of It. This was Jay Ferguson's first single since "The Lines You Amend." It was used as the theme song to the television series MVP. The song peaked at #9 on Billboard's Canada Rock chart.

References

2006 singles
2006 songs
Sloan (band) songs